The Phoenix Prowlers were a professional football team that played in the Women's Football Alliance.  Based in Phoenix, Arizona, the Prowlers played their home games in nearby Mesa at Mesa Community College.

Before joining the WFA in 2009, the Prowlers played two seasons in the National Women's Football Association.  Their inaugural season of 2007 saw them finish with a perfect 8–0 regular season record (outscoring opponents 241–0, no points allowed) and winning South Division and Western Conference titles; however, they were upset in the semi-final round of the playoffs, losing to the St. Louis Slam by a score of 33–29.  Despite finishing 5–3 in 2008 and second place in the Southern Conference West Division, the Prowlers missed the playoffs (only division winners qualified that year).

Season-by-season

|-
| colspan="6" align="center" | Phoenix Prowlers (NWFA)
|-
|2007 || 8 || 0 || 0 || 1st West South || Lost Semi-Final (St. Louis)
|-
|2008 || 5 || 3 || 0 || 2nd South West || ––
|-
| colspan="6" align="center" | Phoenix Prowlers (WFA)
|-
|2009 || 3 || 5 || 0 || 3rd American Pacific || ––
|-
!Totals || 16 || 8 || 0
|colspan="2"| (including playoffs)

2009 season schedule

** = Won by forfeit

External links
 Phoenix Prowlers website

American football teams in Arizona
Women's Football Alliance teams
Sports in Mesa, Arizona
Sports in Phoenix, Arizona
American football teams established in 2007
American football teams disestablished in 2011
2007 establishments in Arizona
2011 disestablishments in Arizona
Women's sports in Arizona